Pine Lake is a reservoir in Fulton County in the U.S. State of New York. It is located in the Town of Caroga north of the Hamlet of Canada Lake. Kane Mountain is located south and Pine Mountain is located east of Pine Lake.

References 

Lakes of Fulton County, New York
Lakes of New York (state)